Piranthus is a genus of jumping spiders first described in 1895 by Tamerlan Thorell, who derived the name from Greek mythology.  this genus contains only two species.

The first male was described in June 2020.
These spiders are mostly black with some white pubescence on the sides of the cephalothorax. The longish abdomen has a dark median stripe in the middle of a wide light median band. The legs are reddish-brown with black rings and very short, with the first pair much more robust than the others. Eugène Simon compared this genus with Padilla.

References

Salticidae
Spiders of Asia
Salticidae genera